Toyotomi may refer to:
Toyotomi clan, a clan in the 16th century Japan, including
 Toyotomi Hideyoshi
 Toyotomi Hideyori
 Chikurin-in
 Asahihime
 Kodai-in
 Yodo-dono
 Oeyo
 Toyotomi Hidetsugu
 Toyotomi Hidenaga
 Toyotomi Hidekatsu
 Toyotomi Kunimatsu
Toyotomi, Hokkaidō, a town in Hokkaidō
Toyotomi, Yamanashi, a former village in Yamanashi Prefecture

Japanese-language surnames